The Al Eslah Society is an organization in Bahrain that represents a modern and moderate conservative Islamic views. Its political wing is the Al-Menbar Islamic Society.

The president and patron of the Al Eslah Society is Shaikh Isa bin Mohammed Al Khalifa, a member of the Al Khalifa royal family and former labor minister of Bahrain.

The name of the society is sometimes transliterated as "Al Islah Society"

See also

 Mohammed Khalid

References

External links
 Al Eslah website

Politics of Bahrain
Islam in Bahrain
Muslim Brotherhood